also Mount Iwo is an active andesitic stratovolcano on the Shiretoko Peninsula of Hokkaidō, Japan. It sits within the borders of the town of Shari. Mount Iō is known for erupting liquid sulphur in the eruptions of 1889 and 1936. Mount Iō literally means, sulphur mountain. There are two explosion craters and a lava dome at the summit of the volcano.

History of eruptions
Volcanic activity started at least 240,000 years ago. Mount Iō has erupted at the following times:
850 AD ± 500 years
1857–1858
23–26 September 1876
24–26 November 1880
9–26 August 1889
15 June 1890–unknown
December 1935–October 1936

See also
 Shiretoko National Park
 List of mountains in Japan
 List of volcanoes in Japan

References

External links 
 
 Shiretoko-Iozan - Japan Meteorological Agency 
  - Japan Meteorological Agency

Io
Io
Io
Holocene stratovolcanoes